Daniil Borisovich Dondurey (May 19, 1947 in Ulyanovsk – May 10, 2017 in Israel) was a Soviet and Russian culturologist, film critic, sociologist of the media, editor in chief of the journal Iskusstvo Kino, and Candidate of Philosophy.

He was a member of Presidential Council for Civil Society and Human Rights, and a member of the Public Council of the Russian Jewish Congress.

Biography
He was born into the family of engineer Boris Danilovich Dondurey and lawyer Faina Moiseevna Cher.

In 1975–1981, he worked at the Institute of the History of Art, in 1981–1986 in the Scientific Research Institute of Culture of the RSFSR.

He compiled a number of scientific collections on the sociology of culture, theory and history of the fine arts, theater and cinema. His works have been translated and published in Bulgaria, Hungary, Vietnam, Germany, Italy, Cuba, Poland, Romania, USA, France, and Czechoslovakia.

References

External links 
 Культура против модернизации
 Нас научат Родину любить

1947 births
People from Ulyanovsk
2017 deaths
Russian sociologists
Cultural academics
Repin Institute of Arts alumni
Recipients of the Nika Award
Deaths from brain cancer in Israel
Russian magazine editors
Russian film critics
Burials in Troyekurovskoye Cemetery
Soviet Jews
Russian Jews